The Löwensköld Ring is a 1925 novel by the Swedish writer Selma Lagerlöf. It was first translated into English by Francesca Martin as The General's Ring, and thus published by Doubleday, Doran in 1928. It is the first installment in Lagerlöf's Ring trilogy, which Doubleday, Doran named The Ring of the Löwenskölds in a 1931 publication. Thus it was followed by Charlotte Löwensköld and Anna Svärd.

See also
 1925 in literature
 Swedish literature

References

1925 Swedish novels
1925 fantasy novels
Novels by Selma Lagerlöf
Albert Bonniers Förlag books
Swedish-language novels